Budalin Township  is a township in Monywa District in the Sagaing Division of Myanmar. The principal town is Budalin.

Bronze Age human remains and artifacts were discovered in Budalin township in 1998–99. There is now a museum in Nyaung Kan Village showing some of the artifacts and skeletons.

Twintaung of Budalin is famous for its natural spirulina. 150 tons of dried spirulina per year was produced from it since 1988, but its yield declined in 2014.

References

External links
Maplandia World Gazetteer - map showing the township boundary

Townships of Sagaing Region